Oba or OBA may refer to:

 Oba (king), a Bini and Yoruba title for certain royal rulers
 Oba (orisha), a spirit who is prominent in various Traditional African religions and Afro-American religions
 Ōba, a Japanese surname
 Oba: The Last Samurai, a 2011 Japanese film
 Oba Chandler (19462011), an American murderer executed in 2011

OBA 

 Office Business Applications, software which uses applications within the Microsoft Office system
 Oklahoma Bible Academy, a Christian secondary institution in Enid, Oklahoma, U.S.
 Oklahoma Bankers Association, a trade association in Oklahoma, U.S.
 Oklahoma Bar Association, the state bar (legal association) of Oklahoma, U.S.
 On base average, a baseball statistic
 One Bermuda Alliance, a Bermuda political party
 Only Boys Aloud, Welsh male voice choir
 Ontario Bar Association
 Openbare Bibliotheek Amsterdam, the public library of Amsterdam
 Optical Brightening Agent, a type of dye used in fabric and paper
 Out-of-band agreement, in communications
 Output-based aid, a type of aid to support the delivery of public services in developing countries
 Oxygen Breathing Apparatus, an oxygen supply system used by the US Navy for firefighting
 Online Behavioral Advertising, a range of technologies and techniques used by online website publishers and advertisers

Places 

 Oba, Ontario a remote hamlet in Ontario, Canada
 Oba Island, in Vanuatu
 Oba-Igbomina, a town in Nigeria
 Oba, Anambra, a town in Anambra State, Nigeria
 Oba River, a river in Nigeria
 Orange Beach, Alabama
 Oba, Indonesia - that part of the administered area of the town of Tidore lying on Halmahera Island

See also 

 Ago-Oba, an electoral ward in the city of Abeokuta, Ogun State, Nigeria
 Obba (disambiguation)